Khairlanji tehsil is a fourth-order administrative and revenue division, a subdivision of third-order administrative and revenue division of Balaghat district of Madhya Pradesh.

Geography
Khairlanji tehsil has an area of 459.40 sqkilometers. It is bounded by Tirodi tehsil in the west and northwest, Katangi tehsil in the north, Waraseoni tehsil in the northeast, Kirnapur tehsil in the east and Maharashtra in the southeast, south and southwest.

See also 
Balaghat district

Citations

External links

Tehsils of Madhya Pradesh
Balaghat district